Alfred Steen (10 June 1896 – 4 March 1949) was a Norwegian freestyle swimmer. He was born in Brooklyn. He competed at the 1920 Summer Olympics in Antwerp. He won a total of sixteen gold medals at the Norwegian championships.

References

External links

1896 births
1949 deaths
People from Brooklyn
Norwegian male freestyle swimmers
Olympic swimmers of Norway
Swimmers at the 1920 Summer Olympics
20th-century Norwegian people